Zenatha Goeieman Coleman (born 25 September 1993) is a Namibian professional footballer who plays as a winger for Turkish Women's First Football League club Fenerbahçe S.K. and captains the Namibia women's national team.

Club career 
In October 2022, Coleman moved to Turkey, and signed with the Istanbul-based club Fenerbahçe S.K. to play in the Women's Super League.

International career 
Coleman was part of the Namibian team at the 2014 African Women's Championship.

References

External links 
 

1993 births
Living people
People from Keetmanshoop
Namibian women's footballers
Women's association football midfielders
Gintra Universitetas players
Zaragoza CFF players
Sevilla FC (women) players
Primera División (women) players
Namibia women's international footballers
Namibian expatriate women's footballers
Namibian expatriate sportspeople in Lithuania
Expatriate women's footballers in Lithuania
Namibian expatriate sportspeople in Spain
Expatriate women's footballers in Spain
Namibian expatriate sportspeople in Turkey
Expatriate women's footballers in Turkey
Turkish Women's Football Super League players
Fenerbahçe S.K. women's football players